The Cambridge Catalogue of Radio Sources may refer to:

First Cambridge Catalogue of Radio Sources
Second Cambridge Catalogue of Radio Sources
Third Cambridge Catalogue of Radio Sources
Fourth Cambridge Survey
Fifth Cambridge Survey of Radio Sources
Sixth Cambridge Survey of radio sources
Seventh Cambridge Survey
Eighth Cambridge Survey
Ninth Cambridge survey at 15GHz
Tenth Cambridge survey